The Australia national cricket team toured New Zealand from February to April 1910 and played seven first-class matches including two against the New Zealand national cricket team. New Zealand at this time had not been elevated to Test status.

Australia won five of the seven first-class matches by comfortable margins, including the two against New Zealand. The match against Canterbury was a close draw, and the last match, against Hawke's Bay, was abandoned without any play taking place.

Background 
In late 1908, The New Zealand Cricket Council asked the Australian Board of Control of Cricket to consider a proposal that the Australian team selected for the 1909 Ashes tour play a series of matches in New Zealand prior to departing for England, as had been the case for the previous tour in 1904/05.  The Australian Board declined this proposal and offered to send a Second Eleven team instead.  The New Zealand authorities rejected this proposal on the grounds that a second-string team would not make the tour a financial success and asked the Australian Board on what terms would the Australian side visit New Zealand on their return journey from England.  Again, this proposal was rejected by the Australian Board and the arrangements for the tour were pushed back to the 1909/10 season.

Team

On 14 Jan 1910 the Australian Board of Control of Cricket met and appointed a selection committee of Clem Hill, Frank Iredale and Peter McAlister to choose the touring squad and appointed Alick Mackenzie as the tour manager and Australian Board representative.  The appointment of Mackenzie to this role was seen as a reward for his services to Australian cricket after a long career.  The 1909/10 season was his last in competitive cricket.  It was his second tour of New Zealand having previously toured with the New South Wales side in 1893/94.

The Australian Board of Control asked each state representative on the board to nominate a set number of players from their state for selection.  New South Wales, Victoria and South Australia were asked to nominate six players each, while Queensland and Tasmania were asked to nominate two each.  From this pool of 22 players the selectors would choose a final touring squad of 13.

Of the players initially selected, Gar Waddy and Stanley Hill were unavailable to make the tour. They were replaced in the team by Tom Warne and Charles Simpson respectively.

The touring party was not a full-strength Australian team.  Of the selected players, only Armstrong, Bardsley, Hopkins and Whitty had previously played Test cricket and no other players outside of those four had toured with the 1909 Australian team in England.  Emery, Kelleway, Mayne and Smith went on to play Tests.

The tour
The touring party left Australia on 5 February 1910, departing Sydney on the steamship Moeraki, and arrived in New Zealand at Wellington on 9 February 1910.  On the evening of their arrival the touring party were officially welcomed to Wellington at a function in the town hall hosted by   Dr. Alfred Newman.

Tour itinerary

Match summaries

Australia v Wellington

Australia v Auckland

Australia v Canterbury

Australia v Otago

1st Unofficial Test Australia v New Zealand

Australia v Manawatu XIII

2nd Unofficial Test Australia v New Zealand

First-class statistics

Batting

Bowling

References

External links
 Australia in New Zealand 1909-10 at CricHQ

1910 in Australian cricket
1910 in New Zealand cricket
1910
International cricket competitions from 1888–89 to 1918
New Zealand cricket seasons from 1890–91 to 1917–18